The Holton-Curry Reader is a basal reader in 8 volumes for the elementary grades, which was published by Rand McNally in 1914, compiled by Martha Adelaide Holton and Charles Madison Curry.

References

American children's book series